The coastline of Malta consists of bays, sandy beaches, creeks, harbours, small villages, cities, cliffs, valleys, and other interesting sites. Here, there is a list of these different natural features that are found around the coast of Malta.

Bays/Beaches
Anchor Bay or (Il-Prajjiet) (Mellieħa)
Armier Bay or (Il-Bajja tal-Armier) (Mellieħa)
Bahar ic-Caghaq (Naxxar)
Bajja San Nikola (Comino)
Balluta Bay (Bajja tal-Balluta)  (San Ġiljan/Sliema)
Blue Grotto (Qrendi)
Blue Lagoon (Bejn il-Kmieni) (Comino)
Daħlet Qorrot (Nadur)
Delimara (Marsaxlokk)
Dwejra (San Lawrenz)
Fomm ir-Riħ (Rabat)
Font Għadir (Sliema)
Ghadira Bay (Qasam Barrani limits of Mellieħa)
Għadira Beach (L-Għadira) (Mellieħa)
Għajn Tuffieħa (Mġarr)
Għar Lapsi (Siġġiewi)
Ġnejna Bay (Il-Ġnejna) (Mġarr)
Golden Bay or Ramla tal-Mixquqa (Mellieħa)
Ħofra il-Kbira (Marsaskala)
Ħofra iż-Żgħira (Marsaskala)
Ħondoq ir-Rummien (Xewkija)
Inland Sea, Gozo or Qawra (Dwejra)
Kalanka tal-Patrijiet (Kalkara)
Marsalforn (Żebbuġ, Gozo)
Marsaskala Bay or Bajja ta' Wied il-Għajn (Marsaskala)
Mellieħa Bay (Mellieħa)
Mgarr ix-Xini (Xewkija)
Mġiebaħ (Mellieħa)
Mistra Bay (Qala Mistra) (San Pawl il-Baħar/Mellieħa)
Paradise Bay (Mellieħa)
Pretty Bay or Il-Bajja s-Sabiħa (Birżebbuġa)
Pwales Beach (San Pawl il-Baħar)
Qalet Marku (Naxxar)
Qawra Bay (Qawra)
Qbajjar Bay (Żebbuġ, Gozo)
 Ramla l-Ħamra (Xagħra)
Ramla ta' Wied Musa (Mellieħa)
Ramla tal-Bir (Mellieħa)
Ramla tal-Qortin (Mellieħa)
Ramla tat-Torri (Mellieħa)
Rinella Bay (Kalkara)
Salina Bay (Naxxar/San Pawl il-Baħar)
San Blas Bay (Nadur)
San Niklaw Bay (Comino)
Santa Maria Bay (Comino)
Selmun Bay (Mellieħa)
Spinola Bay (San Ġiljan)
St George's Bay (Birżebbuġa) or Bajja ta' San Ġorġ
St George's Bay (San Ġiljan)
St Julian's Bay (San Ġiljan)
St Paul's Bay or Il-Bajja ta' San Pawl (San Pawl il-Baħar)
St. Peter's Pool (Marsaxlokk)
St Thomas' Bay or Ramla taż-Żejtun (Marsaskala/Żejtun)
Tal-Għażżenin (San Pawl il-Baħar)
White Rocks or Blata l-Bajda (Pembroke)
Ix-Xatt l-Aħmar (Għajnsielem)
Xgħajra Beach (Ix-Xgħajra)
Ix-Xlendi (Il-Munxar)
Xrobb l-Għaġin (Marsaxlokk)
Xwejni Bay (Żebbuġ, Gozo)

Caves

Bagrat Cave (Mellieħa)
Cat's Cave (Żurrieq)
Dorf Cave (Qala)
Filfla Cave (Żurrieq)
Għar Bittija (Dingli)
Għar Għana (Comino)
Għar Għasfur (San Pawl il-Baħar)
Għar Ħasan (Birżebbuġa)
Għar id-Dud (Sliema)
Għar id-Duħħan (Marsaskala)
Għar il-Qamħ (Għasri)
Għar it-Torkija (Fawwara)
Għar ix-Xagħra (Qrendi)
Għar Qawqla (Marsalforn)
Honeymoon Cave; or Għar ta' l-Għarusa (Żurrieq)
Karolina Cave (Xlendi)
Reflection Cave; or Għar Ta' Żażu (Żurrieq)

Cliffs

Bies Cliffs or Rdum il-Bies (Mellieħa)
Delli Cliffs or Rdum id-Delli (Mellieħa)
Depiro Cliffs or Rdum Depiro (Dingli)
Dikkiena Cliffs or Rdum id-Dikkiena (Siġġiewi)
Dingli Cliffs (Dingli)
Dun Nazju Cliffs or Rdum Dun Nazju (Dingli)
Ġebel Ben Ġorġ (Munxar)
Ħmar Cliffs or Rdum il-Ħmar (Mellieħa)
Il-Maħruq (San Pawl il-Baħar)
Majjiesa Cliffs or Rdum Majjiesa (Mellieħa)
Mdawwar Cliffs or Rdum l-Imdawwar (Mġarr)
Minkba (Żurrieq)
Mitquba Cliffs (Għar Lapsi)
Madonna Cliffs or L-Irdum tal-Madonna (Mellieħa)
Maħruq Cliffs or Rdum il-Maħruq (San Pawl il-Baħar)
Qammieħ Cliffs or Rdum il-Qammieħ (Mellieħa)
Qawwi Cliffs or Rdum il-Qawwi (Mellieħa)
Rdum il-Kbir (Nadur)
Rdum l-Abjad (San Pawl il-Baħar)
Rdum l-Aħmar (Mellieħa)
Sanap Cliffs or L-Irdum Ta' Sanap (Munxar)
Sarġ Cliffs or Rdum tas-Sarġ (Rabat, Malta)
Ta' Bardan Cliffs (Sannat)
Ta' Ċenċ Cliffs (Sannat)
Ta' Kililu Cliffs (Xagħra)
Tal-Gawwija Cliffs (Qrendi)
Tafal Cliffs (Għajnsielem)
Vigarju Cliffs (Rabat)
Xagħra Cliffs or Rdum tax-Xagħra (Xagħra)

Creeks

Daħlet il-Fekruna (San Pawl il-Baħar)
Daħlet il-Ħmara
Daħlet ix-Xilep (Mellieħa)
Daħlet ix-Xmajjar (Mellieħa)
Dockyard Creek (Birgu/Bormla/Senglea)
French Creek (Daħlet il-Franċiżi) (Senglea/Cospicua)
Il-Fossa (Valletta) 
Il-Magħluq (Marsaxlokk)
Kalkara Creek (Daħlet il-Kalkara) (Birgu/Kalkara)
Lazzaretto Creek (Ta' Xbiex/Gżira)
Marfa (Mellieħa)
Marsa Creek or Newport (Marsa/Paola)
Menqa (Marsa)
Msida Creek (Msida/Pietà/Ta' Xbiex)
No. 1 Dock (Bormla)
Pietà Creek (Floriana/Pietà)
Red China Dock
Rinella Creek (Daħlet l-Irnella) (Kalkara)
Sliema Creek (Sliema)
Ta' Ħammud (Mtaħleb)

Harbours

Ċirkewwa (Mellieħa)
Grand Harbour (Valletta/Floriana/Marsa/Paola/Senglea/Bormla/Birgu/Kalkara)
Malta Freeport (Birżebbuġa)
Marsamxett Harbour (Valletta/Floriana/Pietà/Msida/Ta' Xbiex/Gżira/Sliema)
Marsaxlokk Bay (Marsaxlokk/Birżebbuġa)
Mġarr Port (Għajnsielem)
Kalafrana (Birżebbuġa)

Marinas

Bighi Sally Port (Kalkara)
Cottonera Marina (Ix-Xatt tal-Kottonera) (Birgu)
Jews Sally Port (Valletta)
Manoel Island Yacht Marina (Manoel Island/Gżira)
Menqa (Marsalforn)
Mġarr Yacht Marina (Għajnsielem)
Msida Yacht Marina (Msida/Pietà)
Portomaso (San Ġiljan)

Points

Aħrax Point (Mellieħa)
Delimara Point (Marsaxlokk)
Dragonara Point (San Ġiljan)
Dwejra Point (San Lawrenz)
Forna Point (Għasri)
Għallis Point (Naxxar)
Għemieri (Comino)
Griebeġ Point (Mellieħa)
Gżira Point (Marsaskala)
Ħeqqa Point (Għarb)
Il-Kullana (Fawwara)
L-Ilsna (Qrendi)
Maħrax Point
Marfa Point (Mellieħa)
Mellieħa Point (Għajnsielem)
Mgerbeb Point
Miġnuna Point (Marsaskala)
Miġnuna Point, Mistra (Mellieħa)
Munxar Point (Marsaskala)
Parsott (Mellieħa)
Pellegrin Point (Mġarr)
Pinu Point (Għarb)
Ponta l-Kbira
Ras Ħanżir (Paola)
Ras id-Dawwara (Rabat)
Ras il-Bajda (Xlendi)
Ras il-Bajjada (Wied iż-Żurrieq)
Ras il-Ġebel (Xgħajra)
Ras il-Ħamrija (Qrendi)
Ras il-Ħobż (Għajnsielem)
Ras il-Waħx (Mellieħa)
Ras in-Niexfa (Mellieħa)
Ras ir-Raħeb (Baħrija)
Ras l-Irqieqa (Pembroke)
Ras tal-Għemieri
Reqqa Point (Għasri)
Ricasoli Point (Kalkara)
Rxawn Point (Xemxija)
Qala Point (Qala)
Qammieħ Point (Mellieħa)
Qawra Point (San Pawl il-Baħar)
Qrejten Point (Bahar ic-Caghaq)
San Dimitri Point (Għarb)
Santa Maria Point (Marsalforn)
Senglea Point  (Senglea)
Sliema Point (Sliema)
Spinola Point (San Ġiljan)
St. Elmo Point (Valletta)
St. Julian's Point (Balluta)
Tal-Merieħa Point
Tigné Point or Dragutt Point (Sliema)
Wardija Point (Dwejra)
Xagga (Siġġiewi)
Zonqor Point (Il-Ponta taż-Żonqor) (Marsaskala)

Strands

Bridge Wharf (Il-Moll tal-Pont)(Marsa)
Bognor Beach (Plajjet Bognor) (San Pawl il-Baħar)
Coal Wharf (Il-Moll tal-Faħam) (Paola)
Cospicua Wharf (Ix-Xatt ta' Bormla) (Bormla)
Gun Wharf (Il-Moll tal-Kanun) (Floriana)
Gzira Strand (Ix-Xatt tal-Gżira) (Gżira)
Flagstone Wharf (Il-Moll taċ-Ċangaturi) (Marsa)
Freeport Wharf (Il-Moll tal-Port Ħieles) (Birżebbuġa)
Juan B. Azzopardi Strand (Ix-Xatt J.B. Azzopardi) (Senglea)
Hamilton Wharf (Xatt Hamilton) (Senglea)
Hay Wharf (Xatt it-Tiben) (Floriana)
Kalkara Strand (Ix-Xatt tal-Kalkara) (Kalkara)
Lascaris Wharf (Ix-Xatt Lascaris) (Floriana)
Moll tal-Braken (Marsa)
Moll tal-Knisja (Marsa)
Msida Strand (Ix-Xatt tal-Imsida) (Msida)
Pinto Wharf (Ix-Xatt Pinto) (Floriana)
Quarries Wharf (Xatt il-Barrieri) (Valletta)
Qui-Si-Sana Strand (Ix-Xatt ta' Qui-Si-Sana) (Sliema)
Shipwrights Wharf (Moll ix-Shipwrights) (Paola)
Somerset Wharf (Moll Somerset) (Bormla)
Spinola Strand (Triq Spinola) San Ġiljan
Ta' Xbiex Strand (Ix-Xatt ta' Ta' Xbiex) (Ta' Xbiex)
Tigne' Strand (Ix-Xatt ta' Tigné) (Sliema)
Valletta Waterfront (Ix-Xatt tal-Belt) (Floriana)
Wine Wharf (Xatt l-Għassara tal-Għeneb) (Marsa)
Xatt il-Birgu (Birgu)
Xatt il-Forn (Birgu)
Xatt il-Laboratorju (Paola)
Xatt il-Mollijiet (Marsa)
Xatt ir-Risq (Birgu)
Xatt is-Sajjieda (Marsaxlokk)
Xatt iż-Żejt (Birgu)
Xatt San Ġorġ (Birżebbuġa)
Xatt Sant' Anġlu (Birgu)
Xatt ta' San Ġorġ (Paceville)
Xatt ta' Santa Marija (Mellieħa)
Xgħajra Strand (Xgħajra)
Żewwieqaor Xatt l-Imġarr (Għajnsielem)

Valleys

Wied Babu (Żurrieq)
Wied Gerżuma (Baħrija)
Wied Għammieq (Kalkara)
Wied Ħallelin (Żurrieq)
Wied Ħoxt (Qrendi)
Wied il-Buni (Birżebbuġa)
Wied il-Bussaxa (Żurrieq)
Wied il-Ghajn (Ħaż-Żabbar)
Wied il-Għasri (Għasri)
Wied iż-Żurrieq (Qrendi)
Wied Mġarr ix-Xini (Xewkija)
Wied Miġra Ferħa (Rabat, Malta)
Wied Rini (Rabat)
Wied ta' Daħlet Qorrot (Qala)
Wied tal-Ġnejna (Mġarr)
Wied tal-Kantra (Munxar)
Wied Żnuber (Birżebbuġa)

Others

Azure Window (Tieqa Ta' Żerka) (San Lawrenz)
Barbaġanni Rock or Skoll tal-Barbaġanni (Qala)
Buxiħ (Fawwara)
Fessej Rock or Skoll tal-Fessej (Xewkija)
Fungus Rock (San Lawrenz)
Ġebel tal-Ħalfa (Qala)
Ġorf l-Abjad (Żabbar)
Għaġra s-Sewda (Siġġiewi)
Għajn Barrani (Xagħra)
Għajn Ħadid (Selmun)
Għajn Rasul (San Pawl il-Baħar)
Għajn Żejtuna (Mellieħa)
Għallis Rock (Naxxar)
Iċ-Ċumnija (Mellieħa)
Iċ-Ċnus (Sannat)
Il-Blata (Baħrija)
Il-Ħnejja (Wied iż-Żurrieq)
Il-Marbat (Mellieħa)
Il-Mina (Rabat, Malta)
Is-Sikka (Rabat, Malta)
L-Irqiqa ta' Kemmuna (Comino)
Manoel Island (Gżira)
Migra Ferha (Rabat, Malta)
Miġra Ilma (Fawwara)
Mistra Rocks (Nadur)
Nagħaġ il-Baħar (Għasri)
North Comino Channel (Fliegu t'Għawdex)
Qolla l-Bajda (Marsalforn)
Qrejten
Sala Rock (Żabbar)
South Comino Channel (Fliegu ta' Malta)
Ta' Buleben (Qawra)
Ta' Ġfien (Dingli)
Ta' l-Imgħarrqa (Mellieħa)
Ta' Venuta (Nadur)
Ta' Xilep (Qala)
Taċ-Ċawl Rocks or Il-Ġebel taċ-Ċawl (Qala)
Taħt ix-Xifer
Taħt iż-Żiemel (Valletta)
Tar-Riefnu
Xemxija
Xwiegħi

Around the Coast of Malta

From Tigné Point to Malta Freeport

Start from Tigné Point, Sliema, then pass from these strand, coastal roads, and promenades in different sea-side localities around the island.

Sliema
Tigné Point or Dragut Point (Il-Ponta ta' Dragut)
Tigné Strand (Ix-Xatt ta' Tignè)
The Strand, Sliema (Ix-Xatt, Tas-Sliema) - Sliema Ferry
Sliema Creek (Id-Daħla ta' Tas-Sliema)
Gżira
Gżira Strand  (Ix-Xatt, il-Gżira) - Gżira Centre
Manoel Island
Lazzaretto Creek (Id-Daħla ta' Lazzarett) 
Ta' Xbiex
Ta' Xbiex Strand (Ix-Xatt ta' Ta' Xbiex) - Ta' Xbiex
Msida
Ta' Xbiex Strand (Ix-Xatt ta' Ta' Xbiex) - Msida Creek
Msida Strand (Ix-Xatt tal-Imsida) - Msida Creek
Msida Creek (Id-Daħla tal-Imsida)
Pietà
Msida Yacht Marina 
Pietà Creek (Id-Daħla tal-Pietà) 
Sa Maison
Floriana
Hay Wharf (Xatt it-Tiben) 
Sa Maison Bastion (is-Sur ta' Sa Maison) 
Msida Bastion (Is-Sur tal-Imsida) 
Quarantine Bastion (Is-Sur tal-Kwarantina)
Valletta
Great Siege Road (Triq l-Assedju l-Kbir) - Marsamxett
Marsamxett Road (Triq Marsamxett) - Marsamxett
Boat Street (Triq il-Lanċa) - Marsamxett
German Curtain (Is-Sur tal-Ġermaniżi) - Marsamxett 
St. Sebastian Curtain (Is-Sur ta' San Bastjan) - Marsamxett
English Curtain (Is-Sur tal-Ingliżi) - Marsamxett 
Il-Fossa
French Curtain (Is-Sur tal-Franċiżi) - Marsamxett 
St. Gregory's Bastion (Is-Sur ta' San Girgor) - Marsamxett 
Ball Bastion (Is-Sur ta' Ball) - Fort St. Elmo
St. Elmo Point (Il-Ponta ta' Sant' Iermu) - Fort St. Elmo
St. Elmo Breakwater (Il-Breakwater ta' Sant' Iermu) - Grand Harbour 
Abercrombie Bastion (Is-Sur ta' Abercrombie) - Grand Harbour
St. Lazarus Bastion (Is-Sur ta' San Lażżru) - Grand Harbour 
Lower Castile Bastion (Is-Sur ta' Isfel ta' Castile) - Grand Harbour 
Mgerbeb Point (Il-Ponta tal-Imgerbeb) - Grand Harbour 
Castile Bastion (is-Sur ta' Castile) - Grand Harbour
Barriera Wharf (Xatt il-Barriera) - Grand Harbour
St. Barbara Bastion (Is-Sur ta' Santa Barbara) - Grand Harbour
Ta' Liesse
Lascaris Battery (Is-Sur ta' Lascaris) - Grand Harbour 
Lascaris Wharf (Xatt Lascaris) - Grand Harbour
Floriana
Pinto Wharf (Xatt ta' Pinto) - Valletta Waterfront
Valletta Waterfront
Marsa
Wine Wharf (Xatt l-Għassara tal-Għeneb) - Menqa
Mill Street (Triq il-Mitħna) - Menqa
Bridge Strand (Xatt il-Pont) - Menqa
Flagstone Wharf (Il-Moll taċ-Ċangaturi) - Menqa
Firewood Wharf (Il-Moll tal-Ħatab) - Menqa
Il-Menqa tal-Braken 
Moll tal-Braken (Il-Moll tal-Braken) - Menqa
Bridge Wharf (Il-Moll tal-Pont) - Menqa
Church Wharf (Il-Moll tal-Knisja) - Menqa
Wharfs Strand (Xatt il-Mollijiet) - Menqa
Dock No. 7 (Baċir Nru. 7) - Menqa
Paola, Malta
Shipwrights Wharf (Il-Moll tax-Shipwrights) - Corradino
Coal Wharf (Il-Moll tal-Faħam) - Corradino 
Ras Ħanżir 
Corradino Hill (l-Għolja ta' Kordin)
Bormla
Dock No. 6 (Baċir Nru. 6)
French Creek (Id-Daħla tal-Franċiżi) 
Dock No. 5 (Baċir Nru. 5)
Dock No. 4 (Baċir Nru. 4)
Dock No. 3 (Baċir Nru. 3)
Dock No. 2 (Baċir Nru. 2)
Senglea (L-Isla) 
Senglea Point (Il-Ponta tal-Isla) - Grand Harbour 
Juan B. Azopardo Strand (Ix-Xatt Juan B. Azopardo) - Shipbuilding Creek
Il-Maċina
Bormla
Shipbuilding Creek (Id-Daħla tat-Tarzna) 
Cospicua Strand (Ix-Xatt ta' Bormla) 
Dock No. 1 (Baċir Nru. 1)
Dom Mintoff Strand (Triq Dom Mintoff) 
Birgu
Vittoriosa Strand (Xatt ir-Risq)
Vittoriosa Strand (Ix-Xatt tal-Birgu/Triq l-Assedju l-Kbir, 1565) 
Fort St. Angelo (Fortizza Sant' Anġlu) 
It-Toqba 
Kalkara
Xewkija Street (Triq ix-Xewkija)
Kalkara Creek (Id-Daħla tal-Kalkara) 
Kalkara Strand (Ix-Xatt) - Kalkara Centre
Marina Strand (Triq Marina)
Bighi
Rinella Bay (Id-Daħla ta' Rinella) 
Fort Ricasoli (Il-Fortizza ta' Ricasoli) 
Ricasoli Point 
Ricasoli Breakwater (Il-Breakwater ta' Ricasoli) 
Ta' Wied Għammieq 
Rinella Battery 
Kalanka tal-Patrijiet 
Fort St. Roque
Tar-Ramel
Smart City Malta
Taħt il-Ġiebja
Xgħajra
Xgħajra Promanade (Dawret ix-Xatt) - Xgħajra Beach
Ta' Talk 
Tan-Nisa
Tal-Qassisin 
Ras il-Ġebel
Blata l-Bajda 
Il-Golf tal-Blata l-Bajda
Ta' Barkat 
Żabbar
Il-Golf l-Abjad 
Is-Swali 
Il-Golf ta' Xuxetta 
In-Nwadar  
Triq il-Wiesgħa Tower 
Marsaskala
Żonqor
L-Iskoll ta' Sala 
Għar id-Duħħan 
Iż-Żellieqa
L-Ilsien 
Żonqor Point (Il-Ponta ta' Żonqor)
Għar ix-Xama' 
Żonqor Road (Triq iż-Żonqor)
Ta' Monita 
St. George's Street (Triq San Ġorġ)
Marsaskala Marina (Ix-Xatt)
Salini Road (Triq is-Salini)
Marsaskala Bay (Il-Bajja ta' Wied il-Għajn) 
Xifer iċ-Ċerna 
Ta' Barut Point (Il-Ponta ta' Barut)
Il-Mitquba
Siberia Point (Il-Gżira)
Jerma Bay (Ta' Wara l-Jerma)
Miġnuna Point (Il-Ponta tal-Miġnuna) 
Wara l-Abjad
Fajtata Bay 
St. Thomas Bay (Il-Bajja ta' San Tumas) 
Munxar Creek (l-Għassa tal-Munxar)
Munxar Point (Il-Ponta tal-Munxar) 
Marsaxlokk
North-East Point (Il-Ponta tal-Grigal)
Fuq il-Maqjel Point (Il-Ponta ta' Fuq il-Maqjel)
Xrobb l-Għaġin
Taħt il-Maqjel Point (Il-Ponta ta' Taħt il-Maqjel)
Ħofra Point (Il-Ponta tal-Ħofra)
Xrobb l-Għaġin Islet (It-Taqtiegħa)
Rabbit's Point (Ras il-Fenek) 
L-Eħfar 
Ħofra l-Kbira Bay (Il-Ħofra l-Kbira) 
Rabbits' Point (Ras il-Fniek)
Il-Morra
Ħofra ż-Żgħira Bay (Il-Ħofra ż-Żgħira) 
Qali Point (Ras il-Qali)
Qali Creek (Il-Kalanka tal-Qali)
Tumbrell Creek (Il-Kalanka tat-Tumbrell)
Tumbrell Point (Il-Ponta tat-Tumbrell)
Kalanka l-Fonda 
Ix-Xagħra 
Għar Bella
St Peter's Pool Point (Il-Ponta tat-Tawwalija)
St Peter's Pool (Il-Kalanka tat-Tawwalija)
Kalanka Bay (Il-Kalanka tal-Gidien) - Delimara
Delimara Islet (It-Taqtiegħa ta' Delimara)
Delimara Point (Il-Ponta ta' Delimara)
Taħt l-Irdum 
Taħt il-Fanal (Delimara Lighthouse) 
Taħt il-Fortizza (Fort Delimara)
Delimara
Is-Serċ
L-Inġinier 
Ras iċ-Ċagħaq
Il-Wilġa
Taħt it-Trunċiera 
Ras it-Triq 
Ballut Reserve (Il-Ballut)
Il-Magħluq
Fishermen's Strand (Xatt is-Sajjieda) 
Marsaxlokk Bay (Il-Port ta' Marsaxlokk)
Qrejten Point (Il-Ponta tal-Qrejten)
Il-Fossa
Il-Ponta l-Kbira - St. Lucian Tower
Birżebbuġa
Tad-Debbra 
Qajjenza (Il-Qajjenza)
Ferretti Battery
St. George's Strand (Xatt San Ġorġ)
St. George's Bay (Il-Bajja ta' San Ġorġ) 
Sacred Heart Promenade (Dawret il-Qalb Imqaddsa) 
Pretty Bay (Il-Bajja s-Sabiħa) 
Wied il-Buni
Calafrana (Kalafrana)
Malta Freeport (Port Ħieles)

From Ċirkewwa to Tigné Point

Mellieħa
Ċirkewwa
Marfa Road (Triq il-Marfa)
Wied Musa Bay (ir-Ramla ta' Wied Musa)
Marfa Palace (il-Palazz tal-Marfa)
Marfa Bay (ir-Ramla tal-Bir)
Qortin Bay (Ramlet il-Qortin)
Ta' Maċċa
Armier Bay (l-Armier)
Armier Tower (it-Torri tal-Armier)
Little Armier Beach (l-Armier iż-Żgħir)
Armier Redoubt (is-Sur tal-Aħrax) 
White Tower (Ramla) Bay (ir-Ramla tat-Torri)
White Tower (it-Torri l-Abjad)
Daħlet ix-Xmajjar (Rivers Beach)  
Aħrax Point (il-Ponta tal-Aħrax)
Red Cliffs (Rdum l-Aħmar)
Aħrax Tower
Madonna Cliffs (Rdum il-Madonna) 
Slugs Bay (Daħlet ix-Xilep)
Il-Marbat
Tat-Tunnara 
Rdum il-Ħmar (Donkey Cliffs)
L-Aħrax tal-Madonna 
Is-Sur
Taħt is-Sur
Tal-Imgħarqa Bay 
Mellieħa Bay Hotel Beach (Trunċiera ta' Qassisu) 
Qammieħ Road - Mellieħa Bay 
Tunnara Promonade (Dawret it-Tunnara) - Għadira Bay/Mellieħa Bay 
Tas-Sellum 
Santa Maria Strand (Xatt ta' Santa Marija) - Santa Maria Estate
Mġiebaħ Bay (L-Imġiebaħ)
Għajn Ħadid Tower
Tal-Blata Bay (next to St Paul's Island)
Is-Serġ
Rdum il-Bies (Falcon Cliffs)
Tal-Miġnuna (Mistra Battery)
Mistra Bay (il-Qala tal-Mistra)
San Pawl il-Baħar
Rdum Irxaw (Irxaw Cliffs)
Ix-Xagħra tal-Kortin 
Fekruna Bay (Daħlet il-Fekruna)
Rdum Stoppin (Stoppin Cliffs)
Shipwreck Promenade (Dawret in-Nawfraġju) 
Xemxija Hill (Telgħet ix-Xemxija) - Xemxija
Pwales Beach (Xatt il-Pwales) - Pwales
Tal-Kamp
St. Paul's Street (Triq San Pawl) - St. Paul's Bay Old Part
Għajn Rażul 
Veċċja Beach/Barracuda Beach (il-Veċċja)
Għar tal-Veċċja (Veċċja Cave)
Għar Għasfur (Bird's Cave) 
Rdum tal-Maħruq (Maħruq Cliffs)
Tax-Xama' Beach 
Tax-Xama' Lane (Sqaq tax-Xama')
School Street (Triq l-Iskola) - St. Paul's Bay Old Part
St. Publius Street (Triq San Publiju) - St. Paul's Bay Old Part
St. Frances Street (Triq San Franġisk) - Buġibba
Tal-Għażżelin Beach (Qala tal-Għażżelin) - Buġibba 
St. Gerald Street (Triq San Ġeraldu) - Buġibba
Sirens Beach 
Tal-Gillieru Port 
Islet Promanade (Dawret il-Gżejjer) - Buġibba/Qawra
Bay Square/Buġibba Square (Misraħ il-Bajja)
Buġebla 
Buġibba Beach/Perched Beach (ix-Xtajta ta' Buġibba)
Entrenchment Street (Triq it-Trunċiera) - Qawra
Qawra Beach (ix-Xtajta tal-Qawra) - Qawra 
Qawra Point (Ras il-Qawra)
Fra Ben Tower Beach (Ta' Fra Ben) - Blue Flag Beach 
Qawra Promanade (Dawret il-Qawra) - Qawra
Ta' Kella
Luzzu Street (Triq il-Luzzu) - Qawra
Iċ-Ċens tal-Ġebel 
Ta' Nawċiera
Compass Street (Triq il-Boxxla) - Qawra 
Strands Street (Triq Tax-Xtut) - Qawra 
Salt Street (Triq il-Melħ) - Qawra 
J.F. Kennedy Street (Triq J.F. Kennedy) - Qawra
Kennedy Grove 
Salina Bay
Naxxar
Salina, Malta
Salini Road (Triq is-Salini) - Salina
Ta' Zannar
Għallis Tower
Coast Road (Tul il-Kosta) - Baħar iċ-Ċagħaq
Xagħra tal-Baħar 
L-Għoqod
Qalet Marku Beach 
Qalet Marku Battery
Baħar iċ-Ċagħaq Beach (il-Qala ta' Baħar iċ-Ċagħaq)
Ix-Xwiegħi
St. Andrew's Road (Triq Sant' Andrija) - Madliena
Swieqi
St. Andrew's Road (Triq Sant' Andrija) - Madliena
Pembroke, Malta
Madliena Tower
Pembroke Nature Park 
Il-Ponta l-Irqiqa
Mediterranean Street (Triq il-Mediterran) - Pembroke Centre
San Ġiljan
St. George's Tower
St. George's Bay
St. George's Bay Strand (Xatt ta' San Ġorġ)
Dragonara Road (Triq id-Dragunara) - Paceville
Dragonara Point 
St. Julian's Bay (il-Qaliet)
Church Street (Triq il-Knisja) - Paceville
Portomaso
Spinola Point
Spinola Road (Triq Spinola)
St. George's Road (Triq San Ġorġ) 
Spinola Bay
George Borg Olivier Street (Triq Ġorġ Borg Olivier) - Spinola Bay/Balluta Bay
Main Street (Triq il-Kbira)
Balluta Bay
Sliema
Tower Road (Triq it-Torri) - Sliema Centre
Exiles
Font Għadir (Surfside) 
Sliema Point Battery (il-Fortizza)
Chalet 
Għar id-Dud Bay 
Qui-Si-Sana Strand (Xatt ta' Qui-Si-Sana) - Tigné
Il-Fortina 
Tigné Point

From Ċirkewwa to Malta Freeport

Mellieħa
Ċirkewwa
Marfa Road (Triq il-Marfa) - Ċirkewwa
Latnija Road (Triq il-Latnija) - Paradise Bay
Wied Musa Road (Triq Wied Musa) - L-Aħrax
Għajn Tuta Road (Triq Għajn Tuta) - L-Aħrax
Marfa Road (Triq il-Marfa) - Għadira Bay
L. Wettinger Street (Triq L. Wettinger) - Popeye Village
Anchor Bay Road (Triq Tal-Prajjiet) - Popeye Village
Mellieħa Road (Triq il-Mellieħa) - Manikata
Mejjiesa Road (Triq il-Mejjiesa) - Manikata
Old Church Street (Triq il-Knisja l-Qadima) - Manikata
Manikata Road (Triq il-Manikata) - Għajn Tuffieħa
Naħħalija Road (Triq in-Naħħalija) - Għajn Tuffieħa
Mġarr
Golden Bay Road (Triq Għajn Tuffieħa) - Għajn Tuffieħa
Sir T. Zammit Street (Triq Sir Temi Zammit) - Żebbiegħ
Sir Harry Luke Street (Triq Sir Harry Luke) - Mġarr Centre
Kurat Chetcuti Street (Triq il-Kurat Chetcuti) - Mġarr Centre
Main Street (Triq il-Kbira) - Mġarr Centre
Santi Road (Triq is-Santi) - Ġnejna Bay
Rabat, Malta
Fomm ir-Riħ Bay (Il-Bajja ta' Fomm ir-Riħ)
Qortin Point (Il-Ponta tal-Qortin)
Raħeb Point (Ras ir-Raħeb)
Qligħ Point (Il-Ponta tal-Qligħ)
Il-Qligħ
Il-Blata tal-Melħ 
Vigario Cliffs (Rdum tal-Vikarju)
Ix-Xagħra tal-Vikarju 
Il-Marġa
Ġordanja Cliffs (Rdum ta' Ġordanja)
Sarġ Cliffs (Rdum tas-Sarġ)
Is-Siċċa
Il-Frajna
Is-Siċċa tal-Frajna
Il-Mina
Ir-Rfuf 
Miġra Ferħa
Għar Doson 
Tal-Ferli
Ta' Ħammud 
Għar id-Dwieb 
Il-Qaws
Ras id-Dawwara
Ix-Xaqlibi 
Qaws Cliffs (Rdum tal-Qaws)
Tal-Gawwija
Dingli
Iħfar Cliffs (Rdum tal-Iħfar)
Dun Nazju Cliffs (Rdum ta' Dun Nazju) 
Ta' Ġfien 
Depiro Cliffs (Rdum Depiru)
Għar Bittija 
Għar Bittija Cliffs (Rdum ta' Għar Bittija)
Ta' Gidem 
Għajn Gidem Cliffs (Rdum ta' Għajn Gidem) - Dingli Cliffs
Il-Ħotba l-Bajda 
Gidem Cliffs (Rdum ta' Gidem) - Dingli Cliffs
Maddalena 
Siġġiewi
Dikkiena Cliffs (Rdum Dikkiena)
Faqqanija (Il-Faqqanija)
Ħurrieqa Cliffs (Rdum Ħurrieqa) 
Buxiħ 
Il-Kullana 
Ta' Torna 
Miġer Ilma
Fawwara (Il-Fawwara)
Għar it-Turkija 
Għar il-Ħamiem 
Ta' Dnat 
Ix-Xwieki 
Ix-Xaqqa
Il-Gżira 
White Cliff (Is-Sies l-Abjad)
Bieb l-Għerien 
L-Ilsna
Ta' Berwieq
Għar Lapsi
Ix-Xagħra ta' Għar Lapsi
Ras Ħanżir 
Ix-Xagħra tal-Magħlaq
Il-Magħlaq
Qrendi
Għar Ħaxixa 
Il-Mitqub 
Il-Magħlaq
Ħalq it-Tafal 
L-Ilsna 
In-Neffiet 
Ħamrija Point (Ras il-Ħamrija)
Denb il-Bagħal 
Ħaġar Qim 
Tal-Gawwija
Ta' Bexxiexa 
Tal-Maqluba 
Ras il-Bajjada 
Ix-Xagħra ta' Ras il-Bajjada
Wied iż-Żurrieq
Tas-Suldati 
Żurrieq
Blue Grotto (Il-Ħnejja)
Wied Babu
Il-Munqar
Ta' Pietru 
It-Tirxija 
Id-Daħla
Tax-Xagħra 
Wied Ganu
Qalb il-Għarib 
L-Ixmiex
Il-Ħrejfa
Ġebel Maqtugħ 
Wied il-Bassasa
Il-Bajtra
Il-Minkba
Il-Kap ta' Wied Fulija 
Wied Fulija
Il-Borġ ta' Wied Fulija
Taż-Żondu
Ix-Xrejjek 
Wied Diegu
Il-Ħaġra
Ta' Melħa
Għar it-Taraġ
L-Iskoll tas-Sajjetta
Wied Moqbol 
L-Iskolji 
L-Għawejra 
Birżebbuġa
L-Arblu (Ħal Far)
Ta' Żgħer (Ħal Far)
Il-Blajata (Ħal Far)
Wied Żnuber (Ħal Far)
Minżel Spark (Ħal Far)
L-Artal (Ħal Far)
Ħal Far
Blakt il-Far (Ħal Far)
Għar Ħasan
L-Inwadar
Bengħajsa
Għar in-Nagħaġ 
Fort Benghisa (Il-Fortizza ta' Bengħajsa)
Għar Qirduwa 
Ix-Xoqqiet
Wied ix-Xoqqa
Benghisa Point (Il-Ponta ta' Bengħajsa)
Malta Freeport (Port Ħieles)

External links 
Photos of the Malta coast

Coast
Coasts of Malta